Cirque Mountain is a mountain located  northeast of Mount Caubvick, in Labrador, Canada. It is the third-highest mountain in Labrador, after Caubvick (1,652 m) and Torngarsoak Mountain (1,595 m), and lies in the Selamiut Range, which is a subrange of the Torngat Mountains. Before 1971, it was believed that Cirque Mountain was the highest peak in Canada east of the Rocky Mountains and south of Baffin Island; that distinction is now known to belong to Mount Caubvick.

References

Labrador
One-thousanders of Newfoundland and Labrador